In bilingual education, students are taught in two (or more) languages. It is distinct from learning a second language as a subject because both languages are used for instruction in different content areas like math, science, and history. The time spent in each language depends on the model. For example, some models focus on providing education in both languages throughout a student's entire education while others gradually transition to education in only one language. The ultimate goal of bilingual education is fluency and literacy in both languages through a variety of strategies such as translanguaging and recasting.

Bilingual education program models
There are several different ways to categorize bilingual education models, one of the most common approaches is to separate programs by their end goal. This is the approach used below, though it is not the only possible approach. For a more comprehensive review of different approaches to bilingual education worldwide see bilingual education by country or region and intercultural bilingual education.

Maintenance bilingual education 
In a maintenance bilingual education program, the goal is for students to continue to learn about and in both languages for the majority of their education. Students in a maintenance bilingual education program should graduate being able to have a discussion about any content area in either language. Two common forms of maintenance bilingual education are two-way/dual language immersion and developmental (late-exit) bilingual education. Both programs are considered language immersion programs.

Dual language programs 
In a dual language program, students are in mixed classrooms with a balance of native speakers for each language. One common model for dual language programs is the 90/10 model. In this model, 90% of instruction in the early grades is in the student's home language and 10% is in their second language. This proportion changes as the student ages until there is an equal amount of time spent in each language. This can be contrasted with the 50/50 model which starts with an even (50/50) balance between languages from the very beginning of a student's education.

Late exit programs 
In a late exit or developmental program, students all have the same native language. They tend to follow the 90/10 model described above and gradually transition from a majority of instruction in their home language to a more balanced split between languages as they progress through primary school.

Bimodal-bilingual programs 
In a bimodal bilingual program, students are taught in two languages in two different modalities, typically a spoken/written language and a signed language. This type of program is common at schools serving deaf and hard of hearing students.

Transitional bilingual education 

In transitional (early-exit) bilingual education programs, the goal is to provide education in a child's native language to ensure that students do not fall behind in content areas such as mathematics, science, and social studies while they are learning the new language. Unlike in maintenance bilingual education programs, when the child's second language proficiency is deemed satisfactory, they transition to using only that language. This approach is based on the Common Underlying Proficiency model of bilingualism which posits that many of the skills learned in the native language can be transferred easily to the second language later. While the linguistic goal of such programs is to help students transition to mainstream, single language classrooms, the use of the student's primary language as a vehicle to develop literacy skills and acquire academic knowledge also prevents the degeneration of a child's native language.

English as a second language 

English as a second language (ESL) programs are not considered bilingual education programs because they do not aim to have students become bi-literate in two (or more) languages. The goal of ESL programs is for English-language learners learn English after having acquired one or more native languages. ESL is a supplementary, comprehensive English language learning program common in English-speaking countries and countries where English has an important role in communication as a result of colonialism or globalization. One common approach in ESL programs is Sheltered English instruction (SEI).

Bilingual education strategies

Translanguaging 
Translanguaging or language mixing is a strategy that emphasizes using all languages a student knows to support their learning. One example of this is allowing students to express themselves in either or both languages when discussing different academic content. Practicing translanguaging can help students more easily switch between languages.

Language separation 
In a classroom, language separation involves designating one language to a specific time, content, or activity. The goal of language separation is to encourage students to focus on skills in a specific language. Many bilingual programs use a mix of translanguaging and language separation practices to support students in becoming bi-literate.

Scaffolding 
Instructional scaffolding can be used in all types of education, not only bilingual education. A teacher scaffolds instruction to provide the necessary support for students to learn the content. In a bilingual education classroom, this could look like pre-teaching content in the student's native language before teaching the same content in the second language.

Recasting 
When a teacher recasts something a student has said, they repeat what the student said but correct for any grammatical or pronunciation errors, similar to what a parent often does as their child acquires their first language. This can be contrasted with explicit correction in which a teacher explicitly tells a student about an error in their statement, which can also be used in bilingual education.

Effects of bilingual education 

This section focuses on the effects of bilingual education specifically, see Cognitive effects of bilingualism for information about the effects of bilingualism or multilingualism.

Benefits of bilingual education 
The most obvious benefit of bilingual education is proficiency and literacy in two (or more languages). Fluency in multiple languages can lead to increased employment options as well as create more opportunities for intercultural communication.

Bilingual education can also support minority language speakers by communicating the value of their home or heritage language, resulting in increased self-esteem. Additionally, bilingual education models have been shown to improve student engagement and attendance as parent involvement in school activities.

Bilingual education supports students in becoming literate in both languages, which has been shown to increase reading scores for students in both languages. Researchers have proposed that this could be due to students in bilingual programs having an increased awareness of languages and their writing systems.

While there has been significant research on the "bilingual brain," research specifically on how bilingual education impacts brain structure and activation is fairly limited. Though much of the research on bilinguals shows that the benefits of bilingualism are maximized when children are exposed to multiple languages at an early age, as they are in many bilingual education programs. However, some initial research has shown preschool children in bilingual education programs have similar brain activation patterns in response to known and unknown languages as adults who have been learning a second language for several years.

Disadvantages of bilingual education 
In many English-speaking countries, standardized tests are in English, so there is a push to maximize the time spent learning English. Proponents of this framing advocate for Structured English Immersion in which students spend the majority of their day learning about English and in English with scaffolded supports based on their current English knowledge.

Bilingual education requires teachers to be fluent and literate in both languages, as compared to English as a second language programs that only require teachers to have English fluency and literacy.

Bilingual programs for language revitalization 
Bilingual education can also support language revitalization efforts in countries with endangered languages. These dormant languages are heavily intertwined with the culture, place and identity of the subsequent community, so the creation of bilingual programs to help re-awaken the endangered languages is extremely beneficial. Generally speaking, the official primary and secondary languages of a country are favored for bilingual programs, but there have been emerging bilingual programs to re-introduce an endangered language to a community.These education policies are fundamental to a communities' and next generation's identity development. An example that hindered this is that of the residential schools of Canada. Children were punished severely for speaking their mother-tongue, which has caused generational trauma among a plethora of Indigenous persons who attended these schools throughout the country. However, learning from events such as these, has helped spread awareness of language revitalization. 

Bilingual programs for language revitalization are tricky; each language is different, and there is a lack of educational resources and training for teachers in that specific language. Furthermore, there is not enough research done on what the goal for bilingual programs is: is it cultural acknowledgment or bilingualism? Quite often there is a clash between the government educational policies and the actual implementation of said policies. That being said, there has been tremendous progress of working bilingual programs, one being in New Zealand. The Māori community in the Te Kōhanga Reo region created an early language childhood program that includes traditional customs of the culture. The program takes advantage of having native speakers while also recognizing that new and upcoming speakers can help the language adapt to more modern times.

Thanks to the emerging language revitalization programs, more communities can break free from an accommodation norm – feeling threatened to speak their native language due to political tensions, such as colonialism that still persists throughout most nations. The question of whose language and knowledge is more valuable should no longer linger with the help of these bilingual programs.

See also
 English as a foreign or second language
 Structured English Immersion
 French immersion in Canada
 Intercultural bilingual education
 Literacy
 Multilingual Education
 Bilingual education by country or region
 Secondary Level English Proficiency test
 Bimodal bilingualism
 Translanguaging

References

Further reading

Anderson, Barbara A., and Brian D. Silver, "Equality, Efficiency, and Politics in Soviet Bilingual Education Policy, 1934–1980." American Political Science Review, Vol. 78, No. 4 (December 1984), pp. 1019–1039
Baldauf, R.B. (2005). Coordinating government and community support for community language teaching in Australia: Overview with special attention to New South Wales. International Journal of Bilingual Education and Bilingualism, 8 (2&3): 132–144
Carter, Steven (November 2004). "Oui! They're only 3." Oregon Live.com
Crawford, J. (2004). Educating English Learners: Language Diversity in the Classroom (5th edition). Los Angeles: Bilingual Educational Services (BES).
Cummins, J. & Genzuk, M. (1991). Analysis of Final Report: Longitudinal Study of Structured English Immersion Strategy, Early Exit and Late-Exit Transitional Bilingual Education Programs for Language-Minority Children. USC Center for Multilingual, Multicultural Research.
Dean, Bartholomew (ed.) (2004), "Indigenous Education and the Prospects for Cultural Survival", Cultural Survival Quarterly, (27) 4.
del Mazo, Pilar (2006). "The Multicultural Schoolbus: Is Bilingual Education Driving Our Children, and Our Nation, Towards Failure?" [2006 Education Law Consortium].  The article is available at: https://web.archive.org/web/20160303214202/http://www.educationlawconsortium.org/forum/2006/papers/delMazo2006_1.pdf
Dutcher, N., in collaboration with Tucker, G. R. (1994). The use of first and second languages in education: A review of educational experience. Washington, DC: World Bank, East Asia and the Pacific Region, Country Department III.
Gao, Helen. (November 2004). "Fight over bilingual education continues." The San Diego Union-Tribune.
Gonzalez, A. (1998). Teaching in two or more languages in the Philippine context. In J. Cenoz & F. Genesee (Eds.), Beyond bilingualism: Multilingualism and multilingual education (pp. 192–205). Clevedon, England: Multilingual Matters.
Grimes, B. F. (1992). Ethnologue: Languages of the world Dallas, TX: Summer Institute of Linguistics.
Hakuta, K. (1986).Mirror of language: The debate on bilingualism. New York: Basic Books.
Harris, S. G. & Devlin, B. C. (1996). "Bilingual programs involving Aboriginal languages in Australia". In Jim Cummins and David Corso (eds), Encyclopedia of language and education, vol 5, pp. 1–14. Dordrecht: Kluwer Academic Publishers.
 Hult, F.M.  (2012). Ecology and multilingual education. In C. Chapelle (Gen. Ed.), Encyclopedia of applied linguistics (Vol. 3, pp. 1835-1840).  Malden, MA: Wiley-Blackwell.
Kalist, David E. (2005). "Registered Nurses and the Value of Bilingualism." Industrial & Labor Relations Review, 59(1): 101–118.<http://digitalcommons.ilr.cornell.edu/ilrreview/vol59/iss1/6/>
Kloss, Heinz (1977, reprinted 1998). The American Bilingual Tradition. (Language in Education; 88) McHenry, IL: Center for Applied Linguistics and Delta Systems. 
Krashen, S. D. (1999). Bilingual Education: Arguments for and (Bogus) Arguments Against  University of Southern California professor's article is available online at  
Parrish, T.; Perez, M; Merickel, A.; and Linquanti, R.(2006). "Effects of the Implementation of Proposition 227 on the Education of English Learners, K-12, Findings from a Five-Year Evaluation: Final Report." Washington, DC: AIR and San Francisco: WestEd. The complete report is available free at http://www.WestEd.org/cs/we/view/rs/804. An abbreviated, more accessible summary of the findings is available at http://www.WestEd.org/cs/we/view/rs/825
Seidner, Stanley S.(1981–1989) Issues of Language Assessment. 3 vols. Springfield, Il.: State Board of Education.
Summer Institute of Linguistics. (1995). A survey of vernacular education programming at the provincial level within Papua New Guinea. Ukarumpa, Papua New Guinea: Author.
Swain, M. (1996). Discovering successful second language teaching strategies and practices: From program evaluation to classroom experimentation." Journal of Multilingual and Multicultural Development, 17," 89-104.
Thomas, W. P., & Collier, V. P. (1997). Two languages are better than one. Educational Leadership, 55(4), 23–26.

External links
U.S. Department of Education Office of English Language Acquisition
National Clearinghouse for English Language Acquisition
PACE recommendation 1740 (2006) The place of the mother tongue in school education

 
Education by subject
Linguistic rights
Multilingualism
Bilingualism